Yelena Aleksandrovna "Alyona" Shchennikova (born May 12, 2001) is an American artistic gymnast. She was a member of the U.S. National Team from 2017–19 and was the all-around champion at the 2017 U.S. Classic.  She currently competes for Louisiana State in collegiate gymnastics.

Early life
Shchennikova was born in Layton, Utah in 2001 to Russian immigrants. She has two sisters, Polina and Kristina, both of whom are gymnasts.

Career

Senior

2017
Shchennikova turned senior in 2017 and was added to the Senior National Team. She competed at the City of Jesolo Trophy where the USA placed first. She also placed eighth in the All-Around. In July, Shchennikova competed at the U.S. Classic where she placed first in the All-Around and second on Uneven Bars behind Ragan Smith. In August she competed at the National Championships where she placed eighth in the All-Around.

2018
Shchennikova competed at the City of Jesolo Trophy as an individual due to the US not fielding a team. She placed fourth in the uneven bars. In the summer she competed at the American Classic where she placed third on uneven bars. She later competed at the U.S. Classic where she placed fifth in the All-Around and second on uneven bars behind Riley McCusker.  In August Shchennikova competed at the National Championships. She placed ninth in the all-around and fifth on the uneven bars behind Simone Biles, McCusker, Morgan Hurd, and Trinity Thomas. She was later named as the alternate to the 2018 Pan American Gymnastics Championships.

In October Shchennikova participated in the Worlds Team Selection Camp. During the competition she placed third on uneven bars behind McCusker and Biles, eighth on balance beam, and ninth in the all-around, on vault, and on floor exercise.

In December Shchennikova competed at the Voronin Cup in Moscow.  She placed first in the all-around and on uneven bars and placed second on balance beam behind Maria Kharenkova.

2019
In February Shchennikova was named to the team to compete at the 2019 L'International Gymnix competition in Montreal alongside Sloane Blakely, Kara Eaker, and Aleah Finnegan.  While there she helped the USA win team gold.  Individually she won silver in the all-around behind Eaker and on uneven bars behind Ana Padurariu of Canada and won bronze on floor exercise behind Azuki Kokufugata of Japan and Haley de Jong of Canada.

In June, while Shchennikova was doing verification for the 2019 Pan American Games, she ruptured her achilles tendon and announced that she would be out for the remainder of the season.  In August she officially signed her National Letter of Intent with Louisiana State University and joined their gymnastics team in the 2019–2020 season.

NCAA

2019–2020 season
Shchennikova made her collegiate debut in a meet against Arizona, where she only competed on the uneven bars.

2021–2022 season 
Shchennikova competed in the opening match against Centenary.  Her uneven bars score of 9.950 and all-around score of 39.300 were the highest of the night.

Competitive history

References

External links 
 

2001 births
American female artistic gymnasts
American people of Russian descent
People from Layton, Utah
Living people
LSU Tigers women's gymnasts
Sportspeople from Utah
U.S. women's national team gymnasts